Eremias montana (commonly known as the mountain racerunner), is a species of lizard found in the Alvand Mountains in Hamadan Province, Iran.

References

Eremias
Reptiles described in 2001
Reptiles of Iran
Endemic fauna of Iran
Taxa named by Nasrullah Rastegar Pouyani
Taxa named by Eskandar Rastegar Pouyani